Temminck's sunbird (Aethopyga temminckii) is a species of sunbird. 
It is found in up to 1800 m altitude in Borneo, Sumatra, West Malaysia, and south west Thailand in tropical moist montane forests.

This bird's common name and Latin binomial commemorate the Dutch aristocrat and zoologist Coenraad Jacob Temminck.

It has been considered conspecific with Javan sunbird, Aethopyga mystacalis.

The Temminck's sunbird is 10 cm (female) -12.5 cm (male) long. The longer-tailed  male is mostly scarlet, except for a greyish belly, yellow and purple bands between the back and tail, and four purple bands on the head emanating from the beak. The female is drab olive, except for rufous fringes to the wing and tail feathers.

References
Notes

Sources
Robson, Craig:  A Field Guide to the Birds of Thailand 

Temminck's sunbird
Birds of Malesia
Temminck's sunbird